Americardia is a genus of saltwater clams, marine bivalve molluscs in the family Cardiidae, the cockles.

Species
Species within the genus Americardia include:
 Americardia media (Linnaeus, 1758) — Atlantic strawberry cockle

References

Cardiidae
Bivalve genera